Mackey Airlines, Inc., later known as Mackey International Airlines, was a United States airline that primarily served Florida and The Bahamas.  At one point, the airline also operated Douglas DC-8 jetliners in scheduled passenger service  between Florida, Las Vegas, and Los Angeles.

History

Mackey Airlines was founded by former stunt pilot and United States Air Force Colonel Joseph C. Mackey on September 30, 1946.  Flights flew primarily out of its Fort Lauderdale base and from West Palm Beach and Miami. Mackey Airlines served the Bahamas as well as Haiti and the Turks and Caicos Islands in the Caribbean.
In 1956 it acquired Midet Aviation. The original Mackey Airlines was acquired by Eastern Air Lines in 1967, although flights to Bimini from Miami continued into at least 1968.

In 1979, Mackey Airlines acquired Charter Airlines based in Gainesville and flew the only Convair 580 on intrastate Florida routes.

Reformation and later operations

"Colonel Joe" soon began a new company, Mackey International Airlines. It was equipped with secondhand Convair 440 and Douglas DC-6 piston-engine airliners. A Mackey International Air Commuter subsidiary operation was equipped with Beech 99 19-seat turboprop aircraft. In 1977, Mackey's headquarters located in Fort Lauderdale, Florida was the target of a bombing attributed to Cuban anti-Castro activity in the United States. Mackey International Airlines ceased operations in 1981.

Destinations in 1979

Mackey International Airlines was serving the following destinations in 1979:

The Bahamas

 Freeport (FPO)
 Marsh Harbour (MHH)
 Nassau (NAS)
 Treasure Cay (TCB)

Florida

 Fort Lauderdale (FLL) - Headquarters
 Fort Myers (FMY)
 Gainesville (GNV)
 Miami (MIA)
 Naples (APF) 
 Orlando (MCO)
 Panama City (PFN)
 Pensacola (PNS)
 Tampa (TPA)
 West Palm Beach (PBI)

In 1973, Mackey International Airlines was serving additional destinations in the Bahamas including Bimini, George Town, Governors Harbour, Great Harbour Cay and North Eleuthera, and was also serving Grand Turk and South Caicos in the Turks & Caicos Islands.

Fleet
The following prop, turboprop and jet aircraft were operated by the airline at various times during its existence:

 Beechcraft Model 18
 Beechcraft Model 99
 Convair 440
 Convair 580
 Douglas DC-3
 Douglas DC-4
 Douglas DC-6 and DC-6B
 Douglas DC-8-51 (only jet aircraft type operated by the airline)
 de Havilland Canada DHC-6 Twin Otter
 Grumman Goose
 Lockheed Lodestar

See also 
 List of defunct airlines of the United States

Bibliography
J.M.G.Gradidge, The Convairliners Story, 1997, Air-Britain (Historians) Ltd,

References

External links

Mackey Airlines Page
La Floridiana - Florida’s Commuter Airlines from the 1960s to the 1980s: Part Three
Sunshine Skies - Mackey International, featuring vintage photos

Defunct airlines of the United States
Airlines established in 1946
Airlines disestablished in 1981
1946 establishments in the United States
1981 disestablishments in Florida